Mexican-American musician A.B. Quintanilla has released nine studio albums, two live albums, six compilation albums, two remix albums, and thirty-three singles.

A.B. Quintanilla has achieved ten top 10 albums on the US Top Latin Albums chart with three of them being number 1 albums.

Albums

Studio albums

Live albums

Remix albums

Compilation albums

Video albums

Singles

As lead artist

Promotional singles

As featured artist

Music videos

Notes

References

External links
  Archived from the original on May 17, 2014.
 A.B. Quintanilla's official Vevo channel on YouTube
 Kumbia All Starz's official Vevo channel on YouTube

Discography
Quintanilla, A.B.
Quintanilla, A.B.
Quintanilla, A.B.